is the thirty-eighth single of J-pop group Morning Musume. It was released under the Zetima label on February 16, 2009, achieving a weekly rank of 3 on the Oricon singles chart. The Single V DVD of the single was released on February 25, 2009. This was the 26th single to feature Ai Takahashi and Risa Niigaki. This tied them with 1st generation member Kaori Iida for the most singles featured in.

The CD single was released in three editions: one regular edition and two limited editions, each having different cover art. Limited edition A includes a DVD, while limited edition B includes a different DVD.

Track listing 
All tracks are written and composed by Tsunku and arranged by Kaoru Okubo.

CD 
  – 4:35
  – 4:51
 "Naichau Kamo" (Instrumental) – 4:34

Limited Edition A DVD 
 "Naichau Kamo (Another Ver.)"

Limited Edition B DVD 
 "Naichau Kamo (Close-up Ver.)"

Single V DVD 
 "Naichau Kamo"
 "Naichau Kamo (Dance Shot ver.)"

Event V

Members at the time of single 
 5th generation: Ai Takahashi, Risa Niigaki
 6th generation: Eri Kamei, Sayumi Michishige, Reina Tanaka
 7th generation: Koharu Kusumi
 8th generation: Aika Mitsui, Junjun, Linlin

Personnel 
 Ai Takahashi – main vocals, chorus
 Risa Niigaki – center vocal, chorus
 Eri Kamei – center vocals
 Sayumi Michishige – center vocals
 Reina Tanaka – main vocals
 Koharu Kusumi – minor vocals
 Aika Mitsui – minor vocals
 Junjun – minor vocals
 Linlin – minor vocals

Oricon ranks and sales

References

External links 
 Naichau Kamo entries on the Hello! Project official website: CD entry, DVD entry 

Morning Musume songs
Zetima Records singles
2009 singles
Songs written by Tsunku
Song recordings produced by Tsunku
2009 songs
Japanese synth-pop songs
Dance-pop songs